Quiabaya is the capital of the Quiabaya Municipality. It is located in the La Paz Department, Bolivia. As of 2012, it had a population of 378.

References 

Populated places in La Paz Department (Bolivia)